Tapioca pearls, also known as tapioca balls, are edible translucent spheres produced from tapioca, a starch made from the cassava root. They originated as a cheaper alternative to sago in Southeast Asian cuisine. When used as an ingredient in bubble tea, they are most commonly referred to as pearls or boba. The starch pearls are typically  in diameter. By adding different ingredients, like water, sugar, or some other type of sweetener like honey, tapioca pearls can be made to vary in color and in texture. Various forms of tapioca pearls include black, flavored, popping, mini, and clear. Tapioca pearls are commonly soaked in sugar syrup to make them sweet and chewy. In teas, they are often added for their texture, with the flavor being provided by the drink itself.

History

Making jelly-like desserts from starch and using them in dessert dishes and drinks originated from Island Southeast Asia. Traditional versions of tapioca pearls made from native starch sources like palm hearts or glutinous rice include pearl sago, landang, and kaong. They are used in a wide variety of dishes and drinks like bilo-bilo, binignit, es campur, es doger, and halo-halo, among others. The introduction of cassava from South America during the colonial era added another starch source to Southeast Asian cuisine, resulting in cassava-based versions of Southeast Asian dishes that were formerly made from native starch sources. Among these are tapioca pearls, which originated as a cheaper alternative to pearl sago. They are virtually indistinguishable in taste and can be used interchangeably.

Pearl sago and tapioca pearls were introduced to Chinese cuisine via the Hokkien diaspora. They are popularly sold in "jelly tapioca pearls" (also known as "frog egg drinks") which are adaptations of Southeast Asian drinks and shaved ice desserts. They get their Mandarin name, "frog eggs", from their white appearance in the balls' centers after cooking. Vendors who sell the drink usually add syrup or creamer before serving, or serve it on top of shaved ice. In Taiwan, it is more common for people to refer to bubble tea as pearl milk tea (zhēn zhū nǎi chá, 珍珠奶茶) because originally, small tapioca pearls with a  diameter were used. It was only when one tea shop owner—in an attempt to make his tea stand out—decided to use larger tapioca balls and chose a more provocative name, "boba", to represent the difference. In Chinese, the word boba, 波霸, is a combination of a word for bubble and a word for big, which, when found together, is slang for "big breasts" or "buxom lady". When used to describe the drink, the characters 波霸奶茶 directly translate to boba milk tea, and loosely to bubble milk tea. This translation is commonly used by English speakers and refers to the variant with  tapioca pearls.

The making of tapioca balls was also introduced to Brazil (where cassava is native), where they are still known as sagu, despite being made from cassava and not sago palms. Sagu is used in a traditional dish known as sagu de vinho ("wine sago"), popular in the southern state of Rio Grande do Sul. It is usually mixed with sugar and red wine and served warm. It is also often added to tea drinks.

Popularity 

Tapioca pearls have recently gained greater global popularity due to the spread of Taiwanese bubble tea, also called boba tea, across Europe and North America. McDonald's restaurants in Germany and Austria were temporarily selling the dessert beverage as part of their revamped McCafé menu in 2012.

Manufacturing 

Tapioca pearls are derived as baked tapioca products, which are obtained from heat treatment of the moist cassava starch in shallow pans.

Preparation of wet flour 
To create pearls, tapioca flour (also known as tapioca starch) is mixed with boiling water until a kneadable consistency is achieved. The dough is cut and rolled into a spherical shape. One method of achieving the correct shape is called the gangsor method. The starch is inserted into a long, cylindrical twill cloth bag and a jerking motion is used to toss the starch lumps back and forth. The lumps will become more firm and gain a more spherical shape. The process is repeated until the pearls have roughly become the desired size, then sorted according to size.

Another method is to feed the moist flour into open cylindrical pans, which rotate for a certain amount of time and at a specific speed to form the pearls.

Gelatinization 
Traditionally, during heat treatment, the temperature is kept moderate so that only the surface layer of the lumps of the moist starch begins to gelatinize, and this process is described as gelatinization. One process of gelatinization is performed by placing the pearls inside shallow pans, which are then placed inside a brick oven. The pans are covered with a towel soaked in oil or fat to prevent burning the starch. While the pearls are heated over a moderate fire, it is stirred continuously with large forks to prevent burning. When this hand-baking process is applied to manufacture pearls, irregularly shaped beads may be obtained, inferior in color and in other qualities.

In order to produce first-rate products, the starch beads are poured onto plates in a thick layer, and the plates are slowly drawn through a tunnel charged with steam. In this way, uniform gelatinization is ensured.

Drying 
During the gelatinization process, since moisture content does not change much, another drying stage is required to achieve the desired moisture content of 12%. Drying is done in a chamber dryer and when drying, it must have an initial temperature of below 40°C to avoid further gelatinization.

Freezing 
Other than drying, freezing can also be used to preserve pearls before consumption. After gelatinization, the pearls are soaked in ice water to decrease the viscosity and enhance chewiness. If stored, pearls should be frozen using a quick freezing device, such as an air-blast freezer, or through an individual quick freezing process to prevent them from sticking together. One important note is that retrogradation happens quickest at near 0°C temperatures, which would lead to tougher pearls, so it is best to minimize the time that the pearls spend in that temperature range and freeze the pearls to lower temperatures quickly.

Preparation for consumption 

Consumers and food retail establishments can purchase raw tapioca starch and create their own pearls, or they can purchase partially cooked pearls, which have already gone through the gelatinization process. Raw tapioca pearls usually require 45 minutes of boiling whereas partially-cooked tapioca pearls require 30 minutes. To ensure a chewy texture, the pearls are then cooled for approximately 20 minutes. One can verify whether the pearls are ready to serve by taking a pearl and chewing it, making sure it is well-cooked all the way to the center.

In addition to the shorter cooking time, another benefit of partially cooked tapioca is that it lasts longer, with a shelf life of 8 months compared with the shelf life of 6 months for raw tapioca. Cooked tapioca pearls should only be kept for around 4–6 hours. When serving tapioca pearls, the pearls will harden once submerged in water and will eventually soften and lump together. Lumping of tapioca pearls can be avoided by stirring and adding sugar.

After the tapioca pearls are cooked, they should be strained through a colander and then rinsed to remove excess starch.  Then, if they're to be used as something sweet, such as in bubble tea or as a dessert topping, the tapioca pearls are soaked in a sugar solution for ten minutes.  The sugar will also help to prevent them from lumping. The only way to determine the quality of the tapioca pearls is by the texture. The pearls will all stick together if they are too soft and squishy. They will be too difficult to chew if they are too hard. There is a balance for tapioca being both chewy and firm. There is a Chinese term for this pronounced QQ. This is similar to the Italian term al dente describing pasta that is chewable, but not too soft.

Health and nutrition information 
Tapioca consists of mostly carbohydrates - one cup contains nearly 550 calories and 135 grams of carbohydrates. Some benefits of tapioca are that it is a source of iron, dietary fiber, and manganese. In addition, tapioca is a good option for those that have allergies to gluten, nuts, or grain since it does not contain any of them. Tapioca also contains very little cholesterol, fat, or sodium.

Additives 

To support to the creation of tapioca pearls, some additives are used, especially during the tapioca flour making process.

Sulfuric acid is added as a bleaching agent and helps to speed up the process of making flour.
Aluminum sulfate is useful for increasing the viscosity of the flour.
Sulfur dioxide is used to separate the starch from other unwanted substances as well as acting as a bleaching agent, and regulating microbial and enzymatic reactions.
Chlorine (use is banned in many countries) helps to create a higher quality flour and also has disinfecting and bleaching properties.

The tables below list permitted additives in tapioca pearl products regulated under different regions.

Additives permitted as domestic or imported food

Philippines

Singapore

Taiwan

Environmental issues 
Tapioca is not a natural product, as it is processed from cassava. See Manufacturing. There is an issue with tapioca because a large amount of water is needed in order to produce it. One factory reports that it uses around 60 m3 for one ton of tapioca starch just in the first step of processing. With this much water being used, properly disposing of the wastewater is a priority. Tapioca contains cyanide, and depending on whether or not the tapioca is made for human consumption or industrial purposes there will be less or more cyanide. The wastewater used to process the tapioca contains this cyanide and if the wastewater is leaked into bodies of water containing aquatic life, due to the contaminated water's low pH, there is a direct effect on fish and possibly other animals that live on the shores of the polluted water. Water pollution from tapioca manufacturing has been a problem in many countries in Southeast Asia.

Controversy 
German researchers from University Hospital Aachen tested the tapioca pearls from an unnamed Taiwanese chain. According to the New York Daily News, the report showed that carcinogenic chemicals were found in the samples. Chemicals found included styrene, acetophenone, and brominated substances, which were not permitted as food additives. Another German study found carcinogenic PCBs, or polychlorinated biphenyls, in the starchy pearls as well.

But the German reports didn't specify the amount of substances they found in the tapioca pearls, and were not published in peer-reviewed medical or scientific journals. That is saying the accuracy of the results are not ensured.

Phthalates are a class of chemicals added to plastics for the purpose of strengthening plastic's flexibility, durability, longevity and transparency. In 2011, the Canadian Food Inspection Agency warned of phthalate contamination in some food items imported from Taiwan. DEHP, a type of phthalates, was reportedly found in concentrated juice beverages, tea drinks, and other food supplements. This low cost substance had replaced regular food additives, which would normally be an emulsifier for the contents inside the drinks to generate a more attractive and natural appearance. Over-consumption of phthalates can lead to very serious negative health effects such as endocrine disruption, malformation of reproductive organs, infertility and abnormal neurodevelopment. The tolerable daily intake of DEHP is 0.05 mg/kg/day for a 70 kg body weight individual. Fortunately, the study showed that some beverages contain phthalates at levels that do not exceed the daily limit. In high concentrations, it could modify the product's appearance significantly as well.

In 2013, the Agri-Food and Veterinary Authority of Singapore recalled tapioca pearls from bubble tea shops after 11 kinds of Taiwanese starch additives that contained maleic acid were discovered. Maleic acid, when ingested, is known to induce kidney damage. An experiment done on dogs and rats also found kidney and liver damage when they were given daily doses of maleic acid for two years.

In June 2019, there was a case where a 14-year-old girl from China was admitted to the hospital after she described her stomach pain and constipation. After Dr. Zhang Louzhen, from the Zhuji People's Hospital, gave her a CT scan, he saw over one hundred small, grey spheres sitting in parts of her abdomen. The starch that tapioca pearls are made of, in combination of thickeners and other additives, when consumed in large amounts may lead to bowel obstruction.

See also

Arenga pinnata
Chondrus crispus
Sago
Agar

References

Food ingredients